The Slovenian Volleyball League or 1A. DOL, currently named Sportklub prva odbojkarska liga due to sponsorship reasons, is the highest men's volleyball league in Slovenia. It is run by the Volleyball Federation of Slovenia.

Current teams

Teams in the 2022–23 season

Performance by club

References

External links
Volleyball Federation of Slovenia 

Slovenia
Volleyball in Slovenia
Slovenian 1. DOL
Sports leagues established in 1991
1991 establishments in Slovenia
Professional sports leagues in Slovenia